Robert Jack Darnell (November 6, 1930 – January 3, 1995) was an American professional baseball pitcher who appeared in seven games in Major League Baseball  during the  and  seasons for the Brooklyn Dodgers.

Darnell's nine-year pro career began in 1953 and all of it was spent at the Triple-A level or above. In his two Brooklyn trials, he started one contest and relieved in six others. He did not earn a decision or a save, and posted a 2.87 earned run average. In 15 innings pitched, he allowed 16 hits, seven bases on balls, and five earned runs, with five strikeouts. In his lone start, on August 16, 1954, at Ebbets Field Darnell opposed future Hall of Famer Robin Roberts, and surrendered four runs (with two earned) and five hits in two-plus innings of work. The Philadelphia Phillies went on to win the contest, 9–6, with Dodger reliever Clem Labine getting the loss.

References

External links

1930 births
1995 deaths
Baseball players from Oklahoma
Brooklyn Dodgers players
Charleston Senators players
Los Angeles Angels (minor league) players
Major League Baseball pitchers
Montreal Royals players
Omaha Cardinals players
People from Wewoka, Oklahoma
Portland Beavers players
St. Paul Saints (AA) players
Syracuse Chiefs players